Arturo Aram Carmona Rodriguez (born 9 July 1976) is a Mexican actor and former footballer.

Biography 
Carmona was born on July 9, 1976, in Monterrey, Nuevo León, Mexico. He is son of Arturo Carmona and Guadalupe Rodriguez. He has two siblings Judith and Daniel. He started his career as a footballer, but later he graduated to a sports program, his first steps in acting, were in some plays, and as a driver started in a magazine program called Club 34. Debuted in the telenovela Duelo de Pasiones. Next played in La verdad oculta as Mauricio Rivera. In 2006 hosted the program ¡Qué noche! and Hoy a morning television program. He participated in telenovelas Destilando Amor and Muchachitas como tú. In 2008 starred for the first time as a main antagonist in Cuidado con el ángel with Maite Perroni, William Levy and Helena Rojo. Next participated in telenovelas Mar de amor as co-protagonist, Triunfo del amor, Rafaela, Por ella soy Eva, Corona de lágrimas and La tempestad.

Filmography

References

External links 
 

1976 births
Living people
Mexican male telenovela actors
Mexican male television actors
Mexican male film actors
Mexican television presenters
Mexican television talk show hosts
Mexican footballers
Male actors from Monterrey
21st-century Mexican male actors
People from Monterrey
Association footballers not categorized by position